Addie "Jan" Bradley (born July 6, 1943) is an American soul singer.

Biography
Bradley was born in Byhalia, Mississippi, United States, and grew up in Robbins, Illinois. She was noticed by manager Don Talty (who also managed Phil Upchurch) at a high school talent show singing with the Passions. After graduating, she auditioned for Curtis Mayfield, and soon recorded the Mayfield-penned "We Girls", which became a hit regionally in the Midwest (on Talty's Formal Records label). Several singles followed, and another Mayfield song originally issued on Formal, "Mama Didn't Lie" (b/w "Lovers Like Me"), was released nationally in the U.S. by Chess Records in 1963 and hit No. 8 US Billboard R&B chart and No. 14 on the Billboard Hot 100.

Following the single's success, Mayfield and Chess got into a legal battle over the publishing rights to Mayfield's songs, and as a result Bradley was no longer able to work with him. She started writing her own songs and released several further singles on Chess. "I'm Over You" hit No. 24 R&B in 1965; other Chess releases included "Just a Summer Memory" b/w "He'll Wait on Me", "It's Just Your Way", and "These Tears" b/w "Baby What Can I Do". Bradley continued working with Talty after her arrangement with Chess ended, releasing singles for the smaller Adanti, Hootenanny, Doylen, Spectra Sound, and Night Owl labels.

Bradley stopped singing professionally in the early 1970s; she raised a family and became a social worker. She resides in the south suburbs of Chicago and has two children named Timothy and Jamila. She is also the grandmother of three and continues to sing in her church choir. Her records remained popular among devotees of Northern soul. Her catalog of music, both writing and singing, includes soul, pop and rock and roll.

Discography

Singles

References

External links
 

1943 births
People from Robbins, Illinois
People from Byhalia, Mississippi
American soul singers
American women singers
Singers from Mississippi
Living people
Chess Records artists
20th-century African-American women singers
21st-century African-American people
21st-century African-American women